"Say It, Say It" is the debut single by American singer–songwriter (and future voice actress) E. G. Daily. It was released in 1985 as the lead single from her debut album Wild Child. The single went to number one on the U.S. Dance Club Play chart for one week.  On other US charts,  "Say It, Say It"  went to number 71 on the soul chart and number 70 on the Hot 100.

Track listings
7" single (1986)
"Say It, Say It" – 4:34
"Don't Let Them Take the Child Away" – 3:35

12" single (1986)
"Say It, Say It" (Extended version) – 6:52
"Say It, Say It" – 4:34
"Say It, Say It" (Dub version) – 4:40

UK 12" single (1986)
"Say It, Say It" (Extended version) – 6:52
"Say It, Say It" (Dub version) – 4:40
"Don't Let Them Take the Child Away" – 3:35

'''A&M Extended Memories 12" single (1989)
"Livin' It Up (Friday Night)" (performed by Bell and James) – 7:03
"Say It, Say It" (Extended version) – 6:52

Charts

Weekly charts

Year-end charts

Music video
The music video for the song is a take of the 1962 film, Lolita.

References

E. G. Daily songs
1986 debut singles
Songs written by Stephen Bray
Music videos directed by Dominic Sena